Hydrovatus confertus, is a species of predaceous diving beetle found in India, China, Thailand, Laos, Vietnam, Malaysia, Indonesia, Sri Lanka, Myanmar, Celebes, Cambodia, Hawaii, Bangladesh, Pakistan, and Nepal.

References 

Dytiscidae
Insects of Sri Lanka
Insects described in 1882